Car jack may refer to:

 Jack (device), a device for lifting (jacking up) cars and other heavy objects
 Carjacking, the crime of forcedly repossessing an occupied car

See also
Car-Jacked (novel), by Ali Sparkes
 Car Jack Streets, a 2008 hand held video game